Taceddin Ahmedi (full nameTaj ad-Dīn İbrahim ibn Hizr Ahmedi) (1334-1413), was an Ottoman considered one of Anatolia's greatest 14th-century poets. Born in Anatolia, he went to study with Akmal al-Din al-Babarti in Cairo as a young man. As a young man, he visited the court of Bayezid I, and attended the Battle of Ankara, where he met and wrote and qasida to Timur. After Bayezid's death, he dedicated his work "Iskendername" to Süleyman Çelebi. Modeled after the works of Neẓāmī, in 8,000 couplets Ahmedi uses the outline of Alexander the Great's conquests to offer discourse on philosophy, theology, and history. After his patron's death, he was in the employ of Mehmed I until his death in 1413.

References

Poets from the Ottoman Empire
1334 births
1413 deaths
14th-century poets from the Ottoman Empire